Guadalupe Radio Network is an American radio network based in Midland, Texas. It is owned by La Promesa Foundation, and is Doing Business As (D.B.A.) Guadalupe Radio Network. The Guadalupe Radio Network provides Catholic religious radio programming to its stations. As of 2021, it included 38 radio stations in the United States

History
The Guadalupe Radio Network began on July 19, 2000 with the station KJBC, in Midland, Texas. By 2021, it included 39 radio stations in the Houston, Kansas, North Texas, West Texas, South Texas, Central Texas, Alabama, Florida, Washington, DC, and New Mexico markets.

Radio stations
The Guadalupe Radio Network broadcasts in the following markets:

Alabama & Florida Market
 WJUV-FM 88.3, Cullman, Alabama
 WQOH-FM 88.7, Springville, Alabama
 WMMA-FM 97.9, Irondale, Alabama
 WMMA-AM 1480, Irondale, Alabama
 WDLG-FM 90.1 FM, Grove Hill, Alabama
 WDWR-AM 1230, Pensacola, Florida
 WDWR-FM 103.3, Pensacola, Florida
 WPHK-FM 102.7, Blountstown, Florida
 WCVC-FM 96.9, Tallahassee, Florida
 WCVC-AM 1330, Tallahassee, Florida

Kansas Market
 KQSH-FM 90.7, Dodge City, Kansas

Houston, Texas Market
 KSHJ-AM 1430, Houston, Texas
 KSHJ-FM 96.1, Houston, Texas

North Texas Market
 KEES-AM 1430, Gladewater, Texas
 KJON-AM 850, Carrollton, Texas

South & Central Texas Market
 KGWU-AM 1400, Uvalde, Texas
 KJMA-FM 89.7, Floresville, Texas
 KYRT-FM 97.9, Hunt, Texas
 KIVM-FM 91.1, Fredericksburg, Texas
 KBMD-FM 88.5, Marble Falls, Texas

Washington, DC Market
 WMET-FM 103.1, Gaithersburg, Maryland
 WMET-AM 1160, Gaithersburg, Maryland

West Texas &  New Mexico Market
 KPDE-FM 91.5, Eden, Texas
 K210BX-FM 89.9, Van Horn, Texas
 KDCJ-FM 91.5, Kermit, Texas
 KBKN-FM 91.3, Lamesa, Texas
 KQOA-FM 91.1, Morton, Texas
 KSIF-FM 91.7, Wellington, Texas
 K219LT-FM 91.7, Clayton, New Mexico

Spanish
 KVDG-FM 90.9, Midland, Texas
 KKUB-AM 1300, Brownfield, Texas
 KJON-AM 850, Carrollton, Texas
 KXGB-FM 105.1, Great Bend, Kansas
 KODC-FM 102.1, Dodge City, Kansas
 KQOA-FM 91.1, Morton, Texas

Programming
Guadalupe Radio Network's programming consists of a blend of original programming and syndicated radio shows. The vast majority of the latter are produced by the radio arm of Eternal Word Television Network or by Catholic Answers. These programs include "Catholic Answers Live", "The Son Rise Morning Show", "Catholic Connection" featuring Teresa Tomeo, "Women of Grace", "More 2 Life" featuring Greg and Lisa Popcak, "The Doctor is In" featuring Ray Guarendi, "Kresta in the Afternoon" featuring Al Kresta,

GRN also broadcasts a number of shows it produces itself, including, 'Catholic Drive Time' with Joe McClane, 'Intersections: Between Faith, Culture, and Politics with Bree Dail', 'Voicing Truth & Reason with David L. Gray', and 'Face to Face with the Institute of Catholic Culture'.  Some individual GRN radio stations also include local religious programming, as well as diocesan programming.

References

External links
Guadalupe Radio Network Website

American radio networks
Radio broadcasting companies of the United States
Catholic radio stations
Organizations based in Midland, Texas